An n-body choreography is a periodic solution to the n-body problem in which all the bodies are equally spread out along a single orbit. The term was originated in 2000 by Chenciner and Montgomery.  One such orbit is a circular orbit, with equal masses at the corners of an equilateral triangle; another is the figure-8 orbit, first discovered numerically in 1993 by Cristopher Moore and subsequently proved to exist by Chenciner and Montgomery.  Choreographies can be discovered using variational methods, and more recently, topological approaches have been used to attempt a classification in the planar case.

References

External links
 Cris Moore's 1993 paper
 Some animations of 2-d and 3-d orbits, including the figure-8
 Greg Minton's choreography applet which allows the user to search numerically for orbits of their own design
 Animation of the solution with three bodies following each other in a figure of eight orbit
 Youtube videos of several n-body choreographies
 Feature column on Simó's Choreographies for the American Mathematical Society
 A collection of animations of planar choreographies

Orbits
Gravity
Classical mechanics